Visterflo is a lake in Østfold county, Norway. It forms a part of the Glomma watershed together with Ågårdselva and Mingevannet.

References

See also
List of lakes in Norway

Sarpsborg
Fredrikstad
Lakes of Viken (county)